Hypoleucis is a genus of skipper butterflies in the family Hesperiidae.

Species
Hypoleucis dacena (Hewitson, [1866]) – white-fringed recluse
Hypoleucis ophiusa (Hewitson, [1866])
Hypoleucis tripunctata Mabille, 1891

Former species
Hypoleucis sophia Evans, 1937 - transferred to Caenides sophia (Evans, 1937)

References

External links

Natural History Museum Lepidoptera genus database
Seitz, A. Die Gross-Schmetterlinge der Erde 13: Die Afrikanischen Tagfalter. Plate XIII 77

Hesperiinae
Hesperiidae genera